Eutelesia phaeochroa is a moth of the subfamily Arctiinae first described by George Hampson in 1914. It is found in Colombia.

References

Lithosiini